Orphan of Lowood (German: Die Waise von Lowood) is a 1926 German silent drama film directed by Curtis Bernhardt and starring Evelyn Holt, Olaf Fønss and Dina Diercks. It is based on the 1847 British novel Jane Eyre by Charlotte Brontë, and is the last of at least eight silent film adaptations of the novel. It was shot at the Terra Studios in Marienfelde. Director Bernhardt, a Jew wanted by the Gestapo, escaped from Nazi Germany and immigrated to Hollywood (via England) where he directed films for MGM, RKO, Columbia Pictures and Warner Brothers.

Plot
Jane Eyre falls in love with the eccentric Lord Edward Rochester, not realizing he has his mentally ill wife locked up in the attic.

Cast

References

Bibliography
 Bergfelder, Tim & Bock, Hans-Michael. The Concise Cinegraph: Encyclopedia of German. Berghahn Books, 2009.
 Koepnick, Lutz. The Dark Mirror: German Cinema Between Hitler and Hollywood''.University of California Press, 2002.

External links

1926 films
Films of the Weimar Republic
German silent feature films
German historical drama films
Films directed by Curtis Bernhardt
1920s historical drama films
Films based on Jane Eyre
German black-and-white films
Films set in the 19th century
Films set in England
1926 drama films
Silent drama films
Films shot at Terra Studios
Films based on British novels
1920s German films